Asperula taygetea is a species of flowering plant in the family Rubiaceae. 
Asperula taygetea was first described in 1849 and is endemic to Greece.

References

taygetea
Flora of Greece
Taxa named by Pierre Edmond Boissier
Taxa named by Theodor von Heldreich